The Computing Research Association (CRA) is a 501(c)3 non-profit association of North American academic departments of computer science, computer engineering, and related fields; laboratories and centers in industry, government, and academia engaging in basic computing research; and affiliated professional societies.  CRA was formed in 1972 and is based in Washington, D.C., United States.

Mission and activities
CRA's mission is to enhance innovation by joining with industry, government and academia to strengthen research and advanced education in computing. CRA executes this mission by leading the computing research community, informing policymakers and the public, and facilitating the development of strong, diverse talent in the field.

Policy
CRA assists policymakers who seek to understand the issues confronting the federal Networking and Information Technology Research and Development  (NITRD) program, a thirteen-agency, $4-billion-a-year federal effort to support computing research.  CRA works to educate Members of Congress and provide policy makers with expert testimony in areas associated with computer science research. CRA and their Computing Community Consortium (CCC) sponsored the Leadership in Science Policy Institute, a one and half day workshop that took place in Washington, D.C.  CRA also maintains a Government Affairs website and a Computing Research Policy Blog.

Professional development
CRA works to support computing researchers throughout their careers to help ensure that the need for a continuous supply of talented and well-educated computing researchers and advanced practitioners is met. CRA assists with leadership development within the computing research community, promotes needed changes in advanced education, and encourages participation by members of underrepresented groups.  CRA offers Academic Careers Workshops, supports the CRA-W: CRA's Committee on the Status of Women in Computing Research, and runs the DREU: Distributed Research Experiences for Undergraduates Project.

Leadership
CRA supports leadership development in the research community to support researchers in broadening the scope of computing research and increasing its impact on society and works to promote cooperation among various elements of the computing research community.  CRA supports the CRA Conference at Snowbird, a biennial conference where leadership in computing research departments gather to network and address common issues in the field. CRA also supports the Computing Leadership Summit.

Information collection and dissemination 
CRA collects and disseminates information to the research and policy-making communities information about the importance and state of computing research and related policy.  CRA works to develop relevant information and make the information available to the public, policy makers, and computing research community.

CRA publishes the Taulbee Survey, a key source of information on the enrollment, production, and employment of Ph.D.s in computer science and computer engineering (CS & CE) and in providing salary and demographic data for faculty in CS & CE in North America. Statistics given include gender and ethnicity breakdowns.  CRA also provides Computing Research News published ten times annually for computing researchers, and the CRA Bulletin to share news, information about CRA initiatives, and items of interest to the general community.

A. Nico Habermann Award
The A. Nico Habermann Award is offered by the Computing Research Association to individuals in recognition of contributions aimed at increasing the involvement of underrepresented communities in computing research. It is named in honour of the Dutch computer scientist A. Nico Habermann.

Award recipients include:
 2022: Andrea Danyluk
 2021: Mary Jane Irwin
 2020: Carla Ellis
 2019: Maria Gini
 2018: Juan Gilbert, Manuel Pérez Quiñones
 2017: Carol Frieze
 2016: Ayanna Howard
 2015: Ann Quiroz Gates
 2014: Nancy Amato
 2013: David Notkin
 2012: Lucy Sanders, Robert Schnabel, Telle Whitney
 2011: Charles Lickel
 2010: Anne Condon
 2008: Richard E. Ladner
 2007: Janice E. Cuny
 2006: Mary Lou Soffa
 2005: Jane Margolis
 2004: Maria Klawe, Nancy Leveson
 2003: Rita Rodriguez
 2002: Valerie Taylor
 2001: Anita Borg
 2000: Roscoe Giles
 1999: Sheila Humphreys
 1998: Bryant York
 1997: Andrew Bernat
 1996: Caroline Wardle
 1995: Eugene Lawler
 1994: Richard A. Tapia

See also
 Association for Computing Machinery
 CRA was the main organizer of the first Federated Computing Research Conference in 1993.
 CRA-WP
 Informatics Europe is a similar organization to the CRA for Europe.

References

External links
 
 CRA Members
 CRA Board of Directors
 CRA History
 CRA Events

1972 establishments in the United States
Research organizations in the United States
Computer science research organizations
Organizations based in Washington, D.C.
Organizations established in 1972
Computer science awards